Mammana is an Italian surname with major distribution in Italy, the United States, Argentina, and Brazil. Its literal meaning in Italian is "midwife." Primary locations for unrelated Mammana families are Castel di Lucio in Messina, Pachino in Syracuse, Centuripe in Enna, Caltanissetta and San Cataldo in Caltanissetta, and Valledolmo in Palermo.

Notable people with the surname include:

Daniel Mammana, Argentine footballer
Dennis Mammana (born 1951), American astronomy writer, lecturer, and sky photographer
Emanuel Mammana (born 1996), Argentine footballer
Joe Mammana, Italian-American philanthropist
Richard Mammana (born 1979), American ecumenist and writer
The surname is also spelled Mammano, Mamana, Momano (particularly in Rochester, New York), and has been Americanized as Mann, Manners, and Manning.

Bibliography 
 La mammana istruita per validamente amministrare il S. Sagramento del battesimo in caso di necessità alle creature nascenti (Trent, 1760). Treatise for midwives on the valid administration of baptism after birth in cases of necessity.

External links 
Mammana/Mammano 1.0 Genealogical summary by Richard Mammana

Italian-language surnames